Roc de la Guàrdia (Balenyà) is a mountain of Catalonia, Spain. It has an elevation of 891 metres above sea level.

It is the emblematic mountain of Els Hostalets de Balenyà town nearby.

See also
Mountains of Catalonia

References

Mountains of Catalonia